Guido Plante P.M.E.  (August 15, 1936 – May 24, 2015) was a Roman Catholic bishop.

Born in Montreal, Quebec, Plante was ordained to the priesthood in 1961 with the Société des Missions-Étrangères in Laval, Quebec. In 2004, Plante was appointed coadjutor bishop of the Roman Catholic Diocese of Choluteca, Honduras and succeeded to the diocese in 2005. In 2012, Plante retired and remained in Choluteca until his death.

Notes

1936 births
2015 deaths
21st-century Roman Catholic bishops in Honduras
Clergy from Montreal
Roman Catholic bishops of Choluteca